Tampering may refer to:
 Tampering (crime), intentional modification of products in a way that would make them harmful to the consumer
 Tampering with evidence, a form of criminal falsification
 Witness tampering, an illegal attempt to coerce witnesses called to testify in a legal proceeding 
 Tampering (quality control), changing an industrial process in an attempt to improve output but having the opposite effect
 Tampering (sport), the practice, often illegal, of professional sports teams negotiating with athletes of other teams
 Tampering, in computer security, refers to data alteration
 Tampering, or sabotage, is modifying a device to induce failure

See also
Tamper (disambiguation)